Ganges Island, a phantom island known as  in Japanese, appeared at  on maps of the late 19th and early 20th centuries.  Reports of its disappearance appeared in 1933.

The purported island was considered a part of an Anson Archipelago, which included other phantom islands such as Los Jardines as well as real islands such as Wake and Marcus Islands.

See also
Minamitorishima, literally "southern bird island"
Okinotorishima, literally "distant bird island"

References

Phantom islands
Islands of the Pacific Ocean